Kuula is a surname. Notable people with the surname include:
Alma Kuula (1884–1941), Finnish singer
Heikki Kuula (born 1983), Finnish rapper, record producer, and graphic designer
Toivo Kuula (1883–1918), Finnish composer and conductor

See also
Kuula (song) by Ott Lepland
Kuula (software)